Ysbyty Ystwyth is a small village and community in Ceredigion, Wales,  southeast of Aberystwyth. Its church and the parish of the same name were the property of the Order of the Knights of the Hospital of St John of Jerusalem, hence the 'Ysbyty' in the title (Welsh for "hospital"), which never was (despite local belief) a hospice for travellers to Strata Florida.
The community includes the hamlet of Pont-rhyd-y-groes. The area is situated in the Desert of Wales and is wild country. The peak of Llan Ddu Fawr is located in the area and the lakes Llyn Fyrddon Fawr and Fach.

Notes

External links
https://getoutside.ordnancesurvey.co.uk/local/llyn-fyrddon-fawr-ceredigion-sir-ceredigion

References
  Also published in paperback as 
 

Villages in Ceredigion